Molla Sara may refer to:
 Molla Sara, Rasht
 Molla Sara, Shaft
 Molla Sara, Sowme'eh Sara
 Molla Sara Rural District, in Shaft County